The 2016 Illinois Fighting Illini football team represented the University of Illinois at Urbana–Champaign in the 2016 NCAA Division I FBS football season. They were led by first-year head coach Lovie Smith and played their home games at Memorial Stadium in Champaign, Illinois. They were members of the West Division of the Big Ten Conference. They finished the season 3–9, 2–7 in Big Ten play to finish in sixth place in the West Division.

Schedule

The team will host all three non–conference games which are against the Murray State Racers from the Ohio Valley Conference, North Carolina Tar Heels from the Atlantic Coast Conference (ACC), and the Western Michigan Broncos from the Mid-American Conference (MAC).

Schedule Source:

Game summaries

Murray State

North Carolina

Western Michigan

at Nebraska

Purdue

at Rutgers

at Michigan

Minnesota

Michigan State

at #7 Wisconsin

Iowa

at Northwestern

Roster

Awards and honors

Weekly

All-Conference

References

Illinois
Illinois Fighting Illini football seasons
Illinois Fighting Illini football